Gillis may refer to:

People
Gillis (name), list of people named Gillis
Gillis (surname), list of people with this surname

Places
Belgium
Sint-Gillis (Saint-Gilles, Belgium), municipality
Sint-Gillis-Waas, municipality
Sint-Gillis-bij-Dendermonde, town in the municipality of Dendermonde

United States
Gillis, California
Gillis, Louisiana
Gillis Bluff Township, Butler County, Missouri
Gillis Range, a mountain range in Nevada

Things
Gillis Centre complex of historical buildings in Edinburgh, Scotland
Gillis College a former seminary in Edinburgh, Scotland
The Many Loves of Dobie Gillis, a 1951 collection of short stories and a 1959-1963 American TV series
USS Gillis (DD-260) (1919-1945), a Clemson-class destroyer in the United States Navy
Willie Gillis, a fictional character by Norman Rockwell

See also
Gilli (disambiguation)
Gillies